Nizhnevartovsk Airport  is a major airport in Russia located 4 km northwest of Nizhnevartovsk. It is a large civilian airport with an asphalt runway, handling some widebody aircraft. The airport is a key element of the region's gas production region.

Airlines and destinations

References

External links

 Nizhnevartovskavia official website 

Airports built in the Soviet Union
Airports in Khanty-Mansi Autonomous Okrug